During the 1995–96 English football season, Arsenal F.C. competed in the FA Premier League (known as the FA Carling Premiership for sponsorship reasons).

Season summary 
Bruce Rioch was appointed Arsenal boss on 8 June 1995, and took over an Arsenal side that had finished 12th in the Premier League the previous season. Rioch was hired from Bolton Wanderers, after an impressive run culminating in promotion to the Premier League. This also included an FA Cup win against Arsenal in 1994, when they were the holders.

Pre-season signings David Platt and Dennis Bergkamp signaled Rioch's intent to play a more attacking, possession based style. Kevin Campbell and Stefan Schwarz were sold, Paul Davis was freed to join Brentford while Alan Smith confirmed he could no longer play because of his knee injury.

Arsenal made a strong start to the campaign, not losing until matchday 8 at Stamford Bridge. A loss in the North London Derby at White Hart Lane in November was the start of a tough spell however as Arsenal won just three of the next twelve in the Premier League and went out of the FA Cup in the third round to Sheffield United. Arsenal blew their best chance of silverware in February after they went out of the League Cup to eventual winners Aston Villa in the semi-finals.

Rioch did manage to right the ship and lead Arsenal to 5th, on the last day of the season, and a place in the UEFA Cup after losing just two of their final thirteen league matches.

In Rioch's only season, Arsenal saw an improvement from 12th to 5th, improved their goal difference by 14 goals and conceded only 32 goals, a league best. Despite this progress, Rioch had a fallout with Ian Wright, in which Wright ended up turning in a transfer request. Rioch did not get the best out of Bergkamp, nor indeed Wright, but 5th was a creditable finish after the turmoil of George Graham's exit. Still, attendance figures at Highbury were up and the future looked promising for Arsenal.

In the summer of 1996 Rioch clashed with vice-chairman David Dein about transfers. Following Graham's fiasco with an agent that ultimately led to his firing, Arsenal decided that transfers would be dealt with by the board rather than the manager going forward. Rioch and Dein however, failed to see eye to eye about how Arsenal should act in the transfer market. Just days before the start of the next season, by mid-August Bruce Rioch had been sacked.

Rioch's 431 days in charge is the shortest spell of any Arsenal manager since William Elcoat's spell between 1898 and 1899 (when the club was still known as Woolwich Arsenal).

Players

Squad information

Reserve squad 

Players listed are those that made an appearance for Arsenal's reserve team during the season.

In 

Total spending:  £12,250,000

Out 

Total income:  £2,300,000

Club

Coaching staff

Competitions

Standings

Results summary

Results by round

Pre-season 
Arsenal spent their initial pre-season in Sweden playing Swedish sides Kristianstads, Gallstads and GAIS. Returning to England, they then played games against Wolverhampton Wanderers, Inter Milan (at home), and St Albans.

Matches

FA Cup

League Cup

Topscorers 
  Ian Wright 15
  Dennis Bergkamp 11
  David Platt 6
  Paul Merson 5
  John Hartson 4

See also 
 1995–96 in English football
 List of Arsenal F.C. seasons

References

External links 
 Arsenal 1995–96 on statto.com

Arsenal F.C. seasons
Arsenal